Pueblo Nuevo is a village in Pueblo Nuevo Municipality, Durango, Mexico.

As of 2005, the village of Pueblo Nuevo which was the seat of government of the municipality before the 1920s had a total population of 2,837.

Populated places in Durango